The Oi Kwan Hotel is a hotel in Art Deco style in Guangzhou, China. At 64 metres tall with 15 floors, it surpassed the neighbouring Nanfang Building to become the tallest building in the city from upon its completion in 1937 to 1967.

The hotel has a revolving restaurant on the top floor. This was the first one in the city.

See also
 List of tallest buildings in Guangzhou

References

Skyscrapers in Guangzhou
Hotels in Guangzhou
Skyscraper hotels in Guangzhou
Hotels established in 1937
Hotel buildings completed in 1937